World Tofauti (A Different World in English) is a 2017 Kenyan romantic film directed by Kang'ethe Mungai. The film stars Avril Nyambura and Innocent Njuguna, and features Maureen Njau in a supporting role.

Plot
Nina (played by Avril Nyambura) is a woman born and raised in the slums of Nairobi. She meets Hinga (played by Innocent Mungai), a man from a decent background with a good job, who is stranded with a flat tire near the Jomo Kenyatta International Airport, and together with her gang, they rob him of all his valuables. In a twist of fate, the two eventually fall in love, despite the fact that Hinga is engaged to Ciru (Maureen Njau), a demanding and controlling woman of his same societal background. Hinga eventually helps Nina to track down his valuables as well as evade the authorities.

Cast
 Avril Nyambura as Nina, a woman raised in a Nairobi slum, brought up in a life of crime
 Innocent Njuguna as Hinga, a successful Nairobi businessman
 Maureen Njau as Ciru, Hinga's demanding and controlling fiancée

Release
World Tofauti premiered at the Kenya National Theatre in Nairobi, Kenya on 22 December 2017.

Accolades

Awards
 Award for Best Local Language Film and Best Original Score at the 8th Kalasha TV & Film Awards in Nairobi, Kenya on 24 November 2018.

References

2017 films
Swahili-language films
Films set in 2017
Kenyan drama films